The Auburn metropolitan area may refer to:

The Auburn, Alabama metropolitan area, United States
The Auburn, New York micropolitan area, United States
The Auburn, Indiana micropolitan area, United States

See also
Auburn (disambiguation)